Allan York (born 13 July 1941) is an English former professional footballer who played as a left back.

Career
Born in Newcastle upon Tyne, York spent his early career with Walker Boys Club, Newcastle United, West Auckland Town, Kibblesworth Colliery Welfare and Gateshead. He signed for Bradford City from Gateshead in February 1965. He made 45 league appearances for the club, scoring twice, before moving to Lincoln City in July 1967.

Sources

References

1941 births
Living people
English footballers
Newcastle United F.C. players
West Auckland Town F.C. players
Gateshead A.F.C. players
Bradford City A.F.C. players
Lincoln City F.C. players
English Football League players
Association football fullbacks